Canadian federal elections have provided the following results in Northern Montreal and Laval.

Regional Profile
Historically, the City of Laval has been a battleground between the Liberals and the Bloc Québécois. The North End of Montreal has significant immigrant populations and generally supports the Liberals, although the BQ captured Ahuntsic and Bourassa in their 1993 near-sweep of the province, and took Ahuntsic and Papineau in 2006 as the Bloc gained support among immigrant groups. This area was traditionally Liberal until Mulroney's rise to power in 1984, which lowered the Liberals hold on the area to only two seats. The Bloc hoped to gain additional support here to counter any losses in rural Quebec to the Conservatives, who are very weak here.

In the event, however, the region was affected by the NDP "orange wave" that swept through Quebec in 2011, with that party taking all of Laval.  The Liberals retained ridings in Montreal, and the Bloc was left with Ahuntsic as its only seat in the entire Montreal region.  In 2015, however, the Liberals swept the entire region, undoubtedly buoyed by Justin Trudeau representing a riding in this region. They maintained their sweep in 2019.

Votes by party throughout time

Northern Montreal

Laval

2019 - 43nd General Election

2015 - 42nd General Election

Seats won/lost by party

Results by riding

2011 - 41st General Election

Seats won/lost by party

Results by riding

2008 - 40th General Election

Seats won/lost by party

Results by riding

2006 - 39th General Election

Seats won/lost by party

Results by riding

2004 - 38th General Election

Seats won/lost by party

Results by riding

Maps 

 Ahuntsic
 Alfred-Pellan
 Bourassa
 Laval
 Laval-les Îles
 Marc-Aurèle-Fortin
 Papineau
 Saint-Léonard-Saint-Michel

2000 - 37th General Election

Seats won/lost by party

Results by riding

1997 - 36th General Election

Seats won/lost by party

Results by riding

1993 - 35th General Election

Seats won/lost by party

Results by riding 

|-
| style="background-color:whitesmoke" |Ahuntsic
|
|Nicole Roy-Arcelin4,332
|
|Céline Hervieux-Payette20,934
|
|René Samson675 
||
|Michel Daviault22,275 
|
|Marc Lacroix752
|
|Christiane Deland-Gervais 332
|
|Haytoug Chamlian (Ind.)567Rolando Fusco (Abol.)385
||
|Nicole Roy-Arcelin 
|-
| style="background-color:whitesmoke" |Bourassa
|
|Marie Gibeau5,199
|
|Denis Coderre18,167
|
|Raymond Laurent1,146
||
|Osvaldo Nunez18,234
|
|Miville Couture479
|
|Harold Anthony Quesnel102
|
|Lucien Lapointe (Abol.)209
||
|Marie Gibeau
|-
| style="background-color:whitesmoke" |Laval Centre
|
|Bruno Fortier4,497
|
|Guymond Fortin19,027
|
|Afsun Qureshi630
||
|Madeleine Dalphond-Guiral31,391
|
|Yvon Dodier662
|
|Michel Destroismaisons268
|
|Joe De Santis (Nat.)323Emilien Martel (Abol.)172
||
|Jacques Tétreault1Laval-des-Rapides
|-
| style="background-color:whitesmoke" |Laval East
|
|Vincent Della Noce11,140
|
|Raymonde Folco16,196
|
|Stéphane Houle656
||
|Maud Debien31,210
|
|Denis Cauchon586
|
|François Lépine121
|
|Denise Beaubien (Abol.)359
||
|Vincent Della NoceDuvernay
|-
| style="background-color:whitesmoke" |Laval West
|
|Guy Ricard4,167
||
|Michel Dupuy28,449
|
|Marcella Tardif-Provencher678
|
|Michel Leduc26,460
|
|Eddy Gagné546
|
|John Ajemian187
|
|Rick Blatter (Libert.)649Cyril G. MacNeil (Nat.)280Georges Vaudrin (Abol.)109
||
|Guy RicardLaval
|-
| style="background-color:whitesmoke" |Papineau—Saint-Michel
|
|Carmen De Pontbriand1,620
||
|André Ouellet19,524
|
|Gisèle Charlebois694
|
|Daniel Boucher14,661
|
|André Beaudoin667
|
|Normand Normandeau77
|
|Serge Lachapelle (M-L)141P.A. D'Aoust (Abol.)94
||
|André Ouellet
|-
| style="background-color:whitesmoke" |Saint-Denis
|
|Aïda Baghjajian2,196
||
|Eleni Bakopanos21,883
|
|Josée Panet-Raymond969
|
|Gilles Pelchat15,274
|
|Alain-Édouard Lord400
|
|Benoit Chalifoux158
|
|Stéphane Lapointe (Ind.)423Fernand Belisle (Abol.)249Panagiotis Macrisopoulos (M.L.)205
||
|Marcel Prud'homme
|-
| style="background-color:whitesmoke" |Saint-Léonard
|
|Tony Tomassi4,021
||
|Alfonso Gagliano28,799
|
|David D'Andrea583
|
|Umberto Di Genova12,879
|
|Marlène Charland497
|
|Stéphane Levesque77
|
|Claude Brunelle (M-L)141Mauro Fusco (Abol.)91
||
|Alfonso Gagliano
|}

Notes

References

Montreal, N
Politics of Montreal
Politics of Laval, Quebec